Ruins X is a public art work created by American artist Ernest Carl Shaw and located at the Haggerty Museum of Art on the campus of Marquette University in downtown Milwaukee, Wisconsin. The abstract sculpture is part of a series of works in which the artist explores concepts of weight, balance, and order. It is located between Marquette's Haggerty Museum of Art and Helfaer Theatre.

References

Outdoor sculptures in Milwaukee
1978 sculptures
Steel sculptures in Wisconsin
Marquette University
1978 establishments in Wisconsin